Alexandre da Cunha (born 1969) is a Brazilian-British artist, who produces sculpture and wall mounted works, often using found objects. His works have been exhibited around the world, and are located in several major public collections.

Biography 
Alexandre da Cunha was born in Rio de Janeiro in 1969. After initial studies at Fundação Armando Alvares Penteado in Brazil, da Cunha moved to the United Kingdom in the late 1990s, studying sculpture at the Royal College of Art before moving to the Chelsea College of Arts. Since his studies, da Cunha lives and works in both London and São Paulo.

In the early 1990s, da Cunha began working with Galeria Luisa Strina, the oldest contemporary art gallery in Brazil - with his first solo exhibition taking place in 1998. 

In his work, da Cunha mixes the use of found, mass produced and 'ready made' objects with 'traditional' sculpture - by repurposing and reusing them. In 2006, he stated that the items that he uses often have no monetary value, describing them as "things I found on the streets ... ready for the garbage can". For example, the 2004 work Skateboarderistismatronics (fan) is made of recycled skateboards - da Cunha stated that the old skateboards are worthless, but nevertheless they have "huge personal value" to the skaters themselves. Despite the variety in the size of his works - from a small sculpture to a concrete mixer - the aesthetic of the artwork is balanced against the social and cultural history of the materials that the work is made from.

His works are inspired by the Neo-Concrete Brazilian art movement of the late 1950s, Op art, well as modernist architecture found in major Brazilian cities. da Cunha also frequently uses the stereotypes of national identity, such as flags and iconography in his work. Frieze states da Cunha's "historical lineage" includes classical sculpture, baroque patterns, Primitivism, Arte Povera, and Brazilian Modernism.

In the late 2010s, da Cunha was commissioned by Art on the Underground to create a public artwork for the new Northern line extension to Battersea. His work at Battersea Power Station - Sunset, Sunrise, Sunset - is a 100-metre-long kinetic sculpture, using the technology of a rotating billboard. As the COVID-19 pandemic meant that the 2020 New Contemporaries exhibition could not take place, da Cunha and artists Anthea Hamilton and Linder selected works for an online exhibition.

Exhibitions 
Da Cunha has exhibited works at a variety of solo and group exhibitions across the world since the 2000s. Solo exhibitions have included:

 Duplex, Brighton CCA, Brighton, England (2021)
 Duologue with Phillip King, Royal Society of Sculptors, London, England (2018)
 Mornings, Office Baroque, Brussels, Belgium (2017)
 Free Fall, Thomas Dane Gallery, London, England (2016)
 Homebodies, Museum of Contemporary Art, Chicago, United States (2015)
 Dublê, São Paulo, Brazil (2011)
 Laissez-Faire, Camden Arts Centre, London, England (2009)

Collections 

 Tate Collection and Tate Liverpool
 Zabludowicz Collection
 Museum of Contemporary Art, Chicago
 Laumeier Sculpture Park

Public artworks 

 Sunset, Sunrise, Sunset, Battersea Power Station tube station, London
 Mix, Monsoon Building, London 
 Plaza (Arcade), Fenway, Boston, United States
 Mix II, Rochaverá Corporate Towers, São Paulo

Publications 

 Alexandre da Cunha: Arena (2020, Thomas Dane Gallery)
 Alexandre da Cunha: Monumento (2019, Revolver)
 Drawing Room Confessions: Alexandre da Cunha (2015, Drawing Room Confessions)
 Alexandre da Cunha (2012, Editora Cobogó)

References 

1969 births
Brazilian sculptors
Artists from Rio de Janeiro (city)
Alumni of the Royal College of Art
Alumni of Chelsea College of Arts
Brazilian contemporary artists
British contemporary artists
Living people
21st-century artists
20th-century artists